George Henry Walker (20 May 1916 – 1976) was an English football goalkeeper born in Aysgarth, North Yorkshire, who played in the Football League for Darlington, Portsmouth and Nottingham Forest. He played in the Portsmouth team that beat Wolverhampton Wanderers 4–1 in the 1939 FA Cup Final.

Later Harry worked for a company called Pump and Valve Service, he was a skilled engineer and lived at Beeston, a suburb of Nottingham. He had a wife called Ella. He worked for Pump and Valve Service up until his death and was survived by Ella.

Honours
Portsmouth
 FA Cup winner: 1939

References

1916 births
1976 deaths
People from Richmondshire (district)
English footballers
Association football goalkeepers
Darlington F.C. players
Portsmouth F.C. players
Nottingham Forest F.C. players
English Football League players
Footballers from Yorkshire
FA Cup Final players